John Sølling Andersen (born 12 March 1953) is a Danish former footballer who played as a defender for B1903. He made 17 appearances for the Denmark national team from 1975 to 1979.

References

External links
 

1953 births
Living people
Sportspeople from Frederiksberg
Danish men's footballers
Association football defenders
Denmark international footballers
Boldklubben 1903 players